The following are the Guatemala national football team statistical results.

Head-to-head record against other nations
Updated to 12 March 2023 after the match against .

Key

Key to matches
Att. = Match attendance
(H) = Home ground
(A) = Away ground
(N) = Neutral venue
— = Match attendance not known

Key to record by opponent
P = Games played
W = Games won
D = Games drawn
L = Games lost
GF = Goals for
GA = Goals against

Results 1921 - 1950

Results 1953 - 1957

Results 1960 - 1969

Results 2010 - 2019

Results 2020 - 2029

References